Ardian Vehbiu is an Albanian author and translator. He was born in Tirana, Albania in 1959 and now resides in New York City. He is the author of 12 non-fiction and fiction books, as well as of a number of research papers in linguistics and semiotics. He is the winner of the 2009 "Gjergj Fishta" national non-fiction award with "Shqipja totalitare", (2009), as well as the winner of the 2014 "Ardian Klosi" non-fiction award, with "Sende që nxirrte deti", (2013).

His writing is featured regularly in the Albanian press and has been translated in Italian, English and Romanian. He has also translated several works from Albanian into Italian, as well as from Italian, French and English into Albanian.

Bibliography

Fiction
 Ndërhyrjet e zotit Shyti (Tiranë: Dudaj, 2016)
 BOLERO (Tiranë: Dudaj, 2015)
 Gjashtëdhjetë e Gjashtë Rrëfimet e Maks Gjerazit (Tiranë: K & B, 2010)

Non Fiction
 Sende Që Nxirrte Deti: Ese.  (Tiranë: Dudaj, 2013)
 Kundër Purizmit: Polemikë (Tirane: Dudaj, 2012)
 Folklori i Elitave (Tiranë: Morava, 2009)
 Fraktalet e Shqipes: Rrëgjimi i Gjeometrive të Standardit (Tiranë: Çabej, 2007)
 Shqipja Totalitare: Tipare të Ligjërimit Publik në Shqipërinë e Viteve 1945-1990 (Tiranë: Çabej, 2007) 
 Midis Zhgënjimit dhe Mitit: Realitete Amerikane (Tiranë: Max, 2007) 
 Kuzhinat e Kujtesës: Ese Kritike II (Elbasan: Sejko, 2006) 
 Zhargonet e Kombit: Ese Kritike I (Elbasan: Sejko, 2004)
 Kulla e Sahatit (Tiranë: K & B, 2003)
 ''La Scoperta Dell'Albania: Gli Albanesi Secondo i Mass Media (Co-written with Rando Devole, Milano, Paoline, 1996)

References

20th-century Albanian writers
21st-century Albanian writers
People from Tirana
Living people
Albanian emigrants to the United States
1959 births
Italian-language writers
20th-century translators
21st-century translators
Albanian translators
Albanian–Italian translators
English–Albanian translators
French–Albanian translators
Italian–Albanian translators
Albanian novelists
Albanian non-fiction writers